Rebecca Winckworth is an Irish singer. She is a member of the choral group Anúna, with whom she has toured for several years around the world. Winckworth appears on several award-winning Anúna albums, DVDs and collaborations such as Blizzard Entertainment’s soundtrack to Diablo III.

Winckworth has travelled as lead vocalist with several other award-winning shows, such as the Vocal Academy of Paris and Ragús, on tours across Europe, Asia and America. 
In 2014, Winckworth performed as a lead singer with Celtic Nights on a three month tour over 22 states in the USA.
In 2014, Winckworth was lead singer for the world premiere of Titanic Dance in Odyssey Arena Belfast and The Millennium Forum Derry, and was a special guest for Celtic Woman's PBS special, Destiny.

Discography 
Wonderchild (2001)
Christmas Memories [CD and DVD] (Anúna, 2008)
Sanctus (Anúna, 2009)
Christmas with Anúna (Anúna, 2010)
Illumination (Anúna, 2012)
Orla Fallon’s Celtic Christmas (With Anúna, 2010)
The Wiggles’ It’s Always Christmas With You [CD and DVD] (With Anúna, 2011)
Clannad Live at Christ Church Cathedral (With Anúna, 2011)
The Roots of Ireland [CD and DVD] (2012)
Diablo 3 Soundtrack (With Anúna, 2012)
Babylon Sisters EP (2012)
Rebecca Winckworth Album (2013)
Ragús the show DVD (2013)
Celtic Woman: Destiny [CD, DVD, Blu-Ray] (2015)

References

External links 
 
 
 

21st-century Irish women singers
Living people
Year of birth missing (living people)
People from County Wicklow